Irish Creek may refer to:

Irish Creek (Kansas)
Irish Creek (Schoharie Creek tributary), New York
Irish Creek (South Dakota)
Irish Creek (Texas)